Saint-Narcisse-de-Beaurivage is a parish municipality in the Lotbinière Regional County Municipality in the Chaudière-Appalaches region of Quebec, Canada. Its population is 1,091 as of the Canada 2011 Census. It was named after the Narcisse Dionne, an early benefactor of the parish. Beaurivage is associated to the seigneurie of Beaurivage, also known as Saint-Gilles.

History 
On August 26, 1972, five days after escaping from Saint-Vincent-de-Paul jail in Laval, Quebec, notorious French criminal Jacques Mesrine and his Quebec accomplice Jean-Paul Mercier robbed the Caisse populaire of Saint-Narcisse-de-Beaurivage. Ten minutes earlier, they had robbed the caisse of Saint-Bernard, for a total of $26,000 that day.

Demographics 

References

Commission de toponymie du Québec
Ministère des Affaires municipales, des Régions et de l'Occupation du territoire

Parish municipalities in Quebec
Incorporated places in Chaudière-Appalaches
Lotbinière Regional County Municipality